In molecular biology, the Cfr10I/Bse634I family of restriction endonucleases includes the type II restriction endonucleases Cfr10I and Bse634I. They exhibit a conserved tetrameric architecture that is of functional importance, wherein two dimers are arranged, back-to-back, with their putative DNA-binding clefts facing opposite directions. These clefts are formed between two monomers that interact, mainly via hydrophobic interactions supported by a few hydrogen bonds, to form a U-shaped dimer. Each monomer is folded to form a compact alpha-beta structure, whose core is made up of a five-stranded mixed beta-sheet. The monomer may be split into separate N-terminal and C-terminal subdomains at a hinge located in helix alpha3. Both Cfr10I and Bse634I recognise the double-stranded sequence RCCGGY and cleave after the purine R.

 Recognition sequence     Cut
 5' RCCGGY                5' ---R   CCGGY--- 3'
 3' YGGCCR 	         3' ---YGGCC   R--- 5'

References

Protein domains
Molecular biology
Bacterial enzymes
Restriction enzymes
EC 3.1